The Waldorf Astoria Chicago, formerly the Elysian Hotel Chicago, is a luxury hotel located at 11 East Walton Street in the Gold Coast area of Chicago, Illinois.

History
Originally developed as The Elysian, the project was approved in June 2005;  construction took place from 2006 until 2009. The 60 story hotel was designed by Chicago architect Lucien Lagrange and was developed by David Pisor. The project consists of two main parts: a 188-room hotel and 51 condominiums above (estimated at $280 million combined). In 2009 the condominiums were valued between $2.5 and $8.5 million.

The hotel opened in February, 2009. In keeping with the tradition of the Gold Coast neighborhood the entrance of the project is a cobblestone courtyard. Its design emulates the grand hotels of Paris in the 1920s, complete with colonnades, spires, and a motor court.

The hotel was reported to have failed to make a profit in its first two years and in September, 2011 it was announced that its owner Jones Lang LaSalle was looking to sell after Pisor's equity partner chose to remove itself from the hotel business, rather than developing the Elysian into a hotel brand as had been originally envisioned.

By November, 2011 it was announced that an investment group and Hilton Hotels would be purchasing the Elysian and converting it to a Waldorf Astoria. A Waldorf Astoria had been planned as part of an international expansion in 2007, but failed to take off due to the economy in 2008. Although a sales price was not disclosed, it is believed that it was purchased for $95 million, which would put it at a per room price of $505,000.

It was renamed the Waldorf Astoria Chicago on February 1, 2012, although nearly all of the hotel remained the same.

In June 2015 it was reported that Sam Zell of Equity Group Investments had reached an agreement to sell the hotel for $113 million to a group led by hotel investor Laurence Geller (who previously founded Strategic Hotels & Resorts) and including the real estate arm of Chinese manufacturer Wanxiang Group.

Awards and honors
As Elysian Hotel Chicago, it was named Condé Nast Traveler's top hotel in the United States in 2011.

It ranked first in the Travel + Leisure 2012 World's Best Awards readers' survey and is a 2013 TripAdvisor Certificate of Excellence Award recipient.

Location
The Waldorf Astoria Chicago is located in the Gold Coast Neighborhood, a district that is listed on the National Register of Historic Places. It is also close to Oak Street, which is known for its boutiques, high end jewelry stores, and spas, as well as State Street and Rush Street. The latter known for its night life.

Its street level retail tenants are Marc Jacobs and Saint Laurent.

See also
 List of tallest buildings in Chicago

References

External links

  Waldorf Astoria Chicago

Hilton Hotels & Resorts hotels
Skyscraper hotels in Chicago
Condo hotels in the United States
Residential condominiums in Chicago
Residential skyscrapers in Chicago
Residential buildings completed in 2010
New Classical architecture
2010 establishments in Illinois